Karl Georg von Raumer (9 April 1783 – 2 June 1865) was a German geologist and educator.

Biography
Raumer was born in Wörlitz. He was educated at the universities of Göttingen and Halle, and at the mining academy in Freiberg as a student of Abraham Gottlob Werner. In 1811 he became professor of mineralogy at Breslau, and two years later, participated in the German Campaign of 1813. In 1819 he relocated as a professor to the University of Halle, then in 1827 settled at the University of Erlangen as a professor of natural history and mineralogy. Raumer died in Erlangen.

Writings
 Geognostische Fragmente (Geognostic fragments, 1811).
 Der Granit des Riesengebirges (The granite of the Riesengebirge, 1813).
 Das Gebirge Niederschlesiens, der Grafschaft Glatz und eines Theils von Böhmen und der Oberlausitz (The mountains of Lower Silesia, etc., 1819).
 A B C Buch der Krystallkunde (ABC's of crystallography, 1817, 1821).
 Lehrbuch der allgemeinen Geographie (Handbook of general geography, 1832).
 Kreuzzüge, (Crusades, 1840–64).
 Geschichte der Pädagogik (A history of pedagogy; 4 volumes, 1846–55). An important book on education which was translated into English; e.g. "German universities : contributions to the history and improvement of the German universities", translation of volume 4 from Raumer's ''Geschichte der Pädagogik.
 (In English): "Education of girls"; republished from Barnard's American Journal of Education, for March and June, 1861.
 Beschreibrung der Erdoberfläche (Description of the Earth's surface, 6th edition, 1866).
He also wrote an autobiography, published after his death in 1866.

Family
He was the brother of the historian Friedrich Ludwig Georg von Raumer. His son Rudolf von Raumer was a noted philologist.

References
 
 

1783 births
1865 deaths
19th-century German geologists
German mineralogists
People from Wörlitz
University of Göttingen alumni
University of Halle alumni
Academic staff of the University of Halle
Academic staff of the University of Breslau
Academic staff of the University of Erlangen-Nuremberg